Nathan Solomon Joseph  (London, 17 December 1834–1909) was an English philanthropist, social reformer, architect, and Jewish communal leader.

Joseph collaborated on the design of a number of important synagogues, including the Garnethill Synagogue,  New West End Synagogue, and  Hampstead Synagogue. He was also  noted for his work in designing improved housing for the poor.

Joseph published widely on Jewish and  social reform issues.  Among his books are Religion Natural and Revealed: A Series of Progressive Lessons for Jewish Youth (1879) and The Persecution of the Jews in Russia (1890).  He signed his published work N.S. Joseph.

Buildings

Collaborations
 Garnethill Synagogue
  New West End Synagogue
  Hampstead Synagogue

Lead architect
 Sandys Row Synagogue

External links
 http://www.oxforddnb.com/view/article/74454

References

1909 deaths
1834 births
British social reformers
British Jews
Burials at Willesden Jewish Cemetery
Architects from London